Angélique Trinquier (born 16 July 1991 in La Colle, Monaco) is a Monégasque Olympic swimmer. She competed at the 2012 Summer Olympics in the Women's 100 metre backstroke, finishing in 45th place in the heats, failing to qualify for the semifinals. At the 2012 Summer Olympics she was Monaco's flag bearer during the Opening Ceremony. Trinquier also participated in the 2010 Summer Youth Olympics where she competed in the Girls’ 100 m Freestyle event, coming in 47th place.

References

Monegasque female swimmers
People from La Colle, Monaco
Living people
Olympic swimmers of Monaco
Swimmers at the 2012 Summer Olympics
Female backstroke swimmers
Swimmers at the 2010 Summer Youth Olympics
1991 births